Howie Klein (born February 20, 1948) is an American writer, concert promoter, disc jockey, music producer, record label founder, record label executive, progressive political activist, adjunct professor of music, and a fan of punk rock. He is perhaps best known for his role as President of Reprise Records from 1989 to 2001.  He appears occasionally as himself in music-related film documentaries and has received accolades for his stance against censorship and for his advocacy of free speech protection.

Early life
Howie Klein was born in Brooklyn on February 20, 1948. He attended Stony Brook University in New York graduating in 1969, where he first worked in the music industry by writing about bands and booking them for local performances, with the Stony Brook Students Activities Board.  Notable acts he successfully promoted during those years included Big Brother, Byrds, Jackson Browne, Tim Buckley, Sandy Bull, Country Joe McDonald, The Doors, The Fugs, The Grateful Dead, Jefferson Airplane, John Hammond, Jimi Hendrix, Joni Mitchell, Pink Floyd, Otis Redding, The Who, and the Yardbirds.

He then spent several years exploring Afghanistan, India, Nepal, and Amsterdam.

Career

San Francisco 
Then, moving to San Francisco, from 1976 to 1978, at 2-4am, on Friday nights, from KSAN, Klein co-hosted with Norman Davis, and Chris Knab, then-owner of Aquarius Records on Castro Street, North America's first regular punk radio show, The Outcastes, hosting guest interviews with bands such as the Sex Pistols, Iggy Pop, Devo, The Cramps, The Dead Boys, The Nuns, and Roky Erickson. After Davis' departure from the trio in June 1978, later shows were retitiled The Heretics, and featured Davis' replacement, Sean Donahue.  While Klein lived in San Francisco, he also hosted, with Ian Kallen & Ron Quintana, Rampage Radio, a 6-hour Heavy Metal radio show, which began March 6, 1982 and continued until January 16, 2011, on KUSF, later, at Radio Valencia.

In 1978, he and Knab, with Bruce Bridges, co-founded the San Francisco new wave record label, 415 Records. Klein discovered and signed The Units, Romeo Void, Translator and Wire Train among others.

Los Angeles 
Howie Klein joined Sire Records in 1987 and was President of Reprise/Warner Bros. Records between 1989 and 2001. During his tenure at Reprise, he attracted artists to the upscale label such as Lou Reed, with whom he had worked while at Sire. There, he oversaw the career development of recording artists such as Depeche Mode, Talking Heads, Joni Mitchell, The Ramones, The Pretenders, Neil Young, Alanis Morissette, Barenaked Ladies, Eric Clapton, Green Day, Enya, Fleetwood Mac, The Smiths, Ice-T, and dozens of other major acts.  Following the Time Warner merger with AOL, on June 29, 2001, Klein resigned; accepting a buyout.  David Kahne, who had worked for Klein as 415 Records' A&R manager until 1982, now temporarily controlled Reprise as executive vice president of A&R for its parent company, Warner Bros.  The same day Klein resigned, Kahne rejected Wilco's newly recorded album, Yankee Hotel Foxtrot, leading to the termination of Wilco's multi-album contract with Reprise.  The Washington Post noted that the change marked a "seismic shift" from the label's former "artist-friendly" reputation.

Anti-censorship efforts 
During and after his work with Sire and Reprise, Klein distinguished himself as a stalwart opponent of censorship and a dedicated advocate of free speech.  Reprise Records was started by Frank Sinatra in 1960, securing what he saw as artistic freedom from his former record label, Capitol Records.  Klein carried Sinatra's tradition further, clearly articulating his even broader vision that creative freedom was not limited only to choosing one's business and music partners, but also encompassed the freedom to write, even about controversial topics, as one saw fit.

The 1992 United States presidential election saw Bill Clinton choose Senator Al Gore as his vice presidential running mate. This decision disturbed many democrats and music industry professionals, including Klein, because Gore's wife, Tipper Gore, with Susan Baker, had co-founded the Parents Music Resource Center.  The PMRC had initiated senate hearings in 1985 on "potentially harmful lyrics", spearheading a five-year effort that by 1990 had successfully forced the recording industry to implement a voluntary identification and labeling system to warn parents about music containing explicit lyrics.  Tipper Gore's vocal and instrumental role in the PMRC was perceived by some as a campaign of outright censorship against musicians and the music industry itself.  Klein took an active role in publicizing these concerns through speaking engagements and by becoming one of the most influential supporters of a very effective, multimillion-dollar, industry-wide campaign to register and educate young music-loving voters, called Rock the Vote.

His anti-censorship efforts earned him one of two Spirit of Liberty Awards bestowed in 1999 by People for the American Way; co-honored that year was filmmaker and actor Rob Reiner.  Klein created a CD for the awards ceremony, demonstrating his unflinching support for protection of the artistic freedom to convey important social and political ideas in ways that might scare the establishment.  Fuck Censorship was a compilation of censored and off-color songs celebrating everything from cannabis to cross-dressing; the liner notes of which contained a pointed message from Klein, "Sometimes protecting freedom of speech isn't pretty."
In 2000, the American Civil Liberties Union of Southern California honored him with its "Bill of Rights Award" for his activism in the protection of free speech.  He currently serves on the board of directors for People for the American Way.

Post-Reprise 
Klein has appeared (as himself) in three music documentary films: Lifestyles of the Ramones (2001), a George Seminara film about The Ramones; I Am Trying to Break Your Heart (2002), a Sam Jones film about Wilco; and Fix (2011), a Doug Freel film about Ministry.

In early 2005, he was appointed to the board of directors of JamBase.com, a San Francisco-based internet search engine company focused on concert and tour date information, whose founder and CEO Andy Gadiel cited Klein's reputation as "a true artist's advocate".

On August 25, 2011, the Rock & Roll Hall of Fame and Museum archived a gift from Klein, the Howie Klein Collection, consisting of research materials evidencing a broad cross-section of musical acts that appeared on Sire, Reprise, and Warner Brothers labels and spanning his tenure as a record company executive between 1983 and 2001.  The collection comprises several videocassettes of electronic press kits, tubed posters, artist itineraries, and a three-ring binder containing the Warner/Chappell "Mighty Three Music Catalog".  It also contains a certificate for 1000 shares of 415 Records, Ltd.  While copyright interests in the collection were not transferred, its contents are open for research.  Housed in the collection are materials related to all three record companies and to bands and musical artists including B-52's, Babes in Toyland, Barenaked Ladies, BoDeans, Nick Cave and the Bad Seeds, Kasey Chambers, Eric Clapton, The Cult, Depeche Mode, Tanya Donelly, Erasure, Faith No More, Filter, Fleetwood Mac, Chris Isaak, Rikki Lee Jones, Chaka Khan, Living End, Joni Mitchell, Modey Lemon, Nu Flavor, Orgy, Recoil, Lou Reed, The Replacements, Snake River Conspiracy, Steely Dan, Temple of Hiphop, Videodrone, Neil Young, and Zwan.

Klein now lives in Los Angeles, where he writes the progressive political blog, DownWithTyranny! and regularly guest blogs on Crooks and Liars.com's Late Night Music Club feature and on Firedoglake.com.  He is the Founder and Treasurer of Blue America PAC, serves on the board of directors for the Progressive Congress Action Fund, and is a member of the Drum Major Institute for Public Policy's Netroots Advisory Council.  He is also an adjunct professor of music at McGill University in Montreal, where he sometimes lectures.

In popular culture
In his song "Talking Christmas Goodwill Blues," John Wesley Harding mentions a meeting with Klein and Seymour Stein who ask him to record a Christmas song.

References

External links
McGill Reporter article on a talk of Klein's
 DownWithTyranny!

Living people
American bloggers
American music industry executives
Free speech activists
People for the American Way people
People from Brooklyn
Writers from San Francisco
Writers from Los Angeles
1950 births
Music promoters
Activists from New York (state)